I Am Maria is a 1979 Swedish drama film directed by Karsten Wedel. Peter Lindgren won the award for Best Actor at the 16th Guldbagge Awards.

Cast
 Lise-Lotte Hjelm as Maria
 Peter Lindgren as Jon
 Helena Brodin as Maj-Britt
 Frej Lindqvist as Lennart
 Claire Wikholm as Maria's Mother
 Anita Ekström as Anna
 Malin Åman as Pia
 Stig Engström as Sixten
 Bodil Mårtensson as Ulla
 Per Flygare as Teacher

References

External links
 
 

1979 films
1979 drama films
Swedish drama films
1970s Swedish-language films
1970s Swedish films